The Imperial Regalia, also called Imperial Insignia (in German Reichskleinodien, Reichsinsignien or Reichsschatz), are regalia of the Holy Roman Emperor. The most important parts are the Crown, the Imperial orb, the Imperial sceptre, the Holy Lance and the Imperial Sword. Today they are kept at the Imperial Treasury in the Hofburg palace in Vienna, Austria.

The Imperial Regalia are the only completely preserved regalia from the Middle Ages.
During the late Middle Ages, the word Imperial Regalia (Reichskleinodien) had many variations in the Latin language. The regalia were  named in Latin: insignia imperialia, regalia insignia, insignia imperalis capellae quae regalia dicuntur and other similar words.

Components
The regalia is composed of two different parts. The greater group are the so-called Nürnberger Kleinodien (roughly translated Nuremberg jewels), named after the town of Nuremberg, where the regalia were kept from 1424 to 1796. This part comprised the Imperial Crown, parts of the coronation vestments, the Imperial Orb, the Imperial Sceptre, the Imperial Sword, the Ceremonial Sword, the Imperial Cross, the Holy Lance, and all other reliquaries except St. Stephen's Purse.

St. Stephen's Purse, the Imperial Bible, and the so-called Sabre of Charlemagne were kept in Aachen until 1794, which gave them the name Aachener Kleinodien (Aachen jewels). It is not known how long they have been considered among the Imperial Regalia, nor how long they had been in Aachen.

History

Middle Ages

The inventory of the regalia during the late Middle Ages normally consisted only of five to six items. Goffredo da Viterbo counted following items: the Imperial Cross, the Holy Lance, the crown, the sceptre, the orb, and the sword. On other lists, however, the sword is not mentioned.

Whether the medieval chronicles really do refer to the same regalia which are kept in Vienna today depends on a variety of factors. Descriptions of the emperors only spoke of them being "clothed in imperial regalia" without exactly describing which items they were.

The crown can only be dated back to the 13th century, when it is described in a medieval poem. The poem speaks of the Waise (i.e., The Orphan) stone, which was a big and prominent jewel on the front of the crown, probably a white opal with an exceptionally brilliant red fire and has since been replaced by a triangular blue sapphire.  The first definite pictorial image of the crown can only be found later in a mural in the Karlstein Castle close to Prague.

It is also difficult to define for how long the Imperial and Ceremonial Swords have belonged to the regalia.

Whereabouts in medieval times
Until the 15th century the Imperial Regalia had no firm depository and sometimes accompanied the ruler on his trips through the empire. Above all with conflicts around the legality of the rule it was important to own the insignia. As depositories during this time some imperial castles or seats of reliable ministerialises are known:

 Limburg Abbey near Dürkheim (Palatinate) (11th century)
 Harzburg (11th century)
 Imperial Palace of Goslar (11th, 13th century)
 Castle Hammerstein at Rhine (1125)
 Trifels Castle near Annweiler (12th, 13th century, with interruptions)
 Imperial chapel of Haguenau (12th, 13th century, with interruptions)
 Waldburg Castle near Ravensburg (c. 1220–1240)
 Krautheim Castle on the river Jagst (probably 1240–1242)
 Kyburg Palace, today Canton of Zurich in Switzerland (1273–1322, with one interruption)
 Castle Stein, municipality of Rheinfelden in the canton of Aargau in Switzerland (about 1280 under Rudolf of Habsburg)
 Alter Hof (Old Court) in Munich (under Ludwig the Bavarian, 1324–1350)
 St. Vitus Cathedral (Prague) and Karlstein Castle in Bohemia (c. 1350/52–1421)
 Plintenburg and Ofen in Hungary (1421–1424)

Committal to Nuremberg

Emperor Sigismund transferred the Imperial Regalia "to everlasting preservation" to the Free Imperial City of Nuremberg with a dated document on 29 September 1423. They arrived there on 22 March the following year from Plintenburg, and were kept in the chapel of the Heilig-Geist-Spital. Once a year they were shown to believers in a so-called Heiltumsweisung (worship show), on the fourteenth day after Good Friday. For coronations they were brought to Aachen or Frankfurt Cathedral.

Ceremonial decoration

Since the Age of Enlightenment at least, the imperial regalia had no constitutive or confirming character for the imperial function any more. It served merely as an adornment for the coronation of the emperors, who all belonged to the House of Habsburg and since the mid-16th century had ceased to be crowned by the pope. 
A young Johann Wolfgang Goethe on 3 April 1764, was an eyewitness in Frankfurt during the coronation of the 18-year-old Joseph, Duke of Lorraine to King in Germany. He later wrote dismissively about the event in his autobiography Dichtung und Wahrheit:

Refuge in Vienna
While French troops were advancing in 1794 in the direction of Aachen during the War of the First Coalition, the pieces located there were brought to the Capuchin's monastery in Paderborn. In July 1796, French troops crossed the Rhine and shortly thereafter reached Franconia. On 23 July the most important parts of the Imperial Regalia (crown, sceptre, orb, eight pieces of the vestments) were hastily evacuated by Nuremberg colonel Johann Georg Haller von Hallerstein from Nuremberg to Regensburg, where they arrived the next day. On 28 September the remaining parts of the jewels were also delivered to Regensburg. Since this elopement parts of the treasure are missing.

Until 1800 the Imperial Regalia remained in the Saint Emmeram's Abbey in Regensburg, from where their transfer began to Vienna on 30 June. The committal there is verified for 29 October. The pieces from Aachen were brought in 1798 to Hildesheim and didn't reach Vienna before 1801.

Nazi and post-war period

After the Anschluss of Austria to the Nazi Reich in 1938 the imperial regalia were returned on instruction by Adolf Hitler to Nuremberg, where they were exhibited in the Katharinenkirche. In the Second World War they were stored for protection from air raids in the Historischer Kunstbunker beneath Nuremberg Castle.
In 1945 the imperial regalia were found there by US soldiers and were brought back in 1946 to the Hofburg in Vienna.

See also

Coronation of the Holy Roman Emperor
Imperial Treasury, Vienna

References

Bibliography
Weltliche und Geistliche Schatzkammer. Bildführer. Kunsthistorisches Museum, Vienna. 1987. 
Fillitz, Hermann. Die Schatzkammer in Wien: Symbole abendländischen Kaisertums. Vienna, 1986. 
Fillitz, Hermann. Die Insignien und Kleinodien des Heiligen Römischen Reiches, 1954.
Heigl, Peter. The Imperial Regalia in the Nazi Bunker/ Der Reichsschatz im Nazibunker. Nuremberg 2005.

External links

The Imperial Treasury Museum Vienna (Wiener Schatzkammer)

 
Medieval European metalwork objects